A terrorist is an individual, organisation or nation who terrorizes masses of people such as by participating in terrorism.

Terrorist(s) or The Terrorist(s) may also refer to:

Film 
 The Terrorist (1962 film), an Argentine thriller film
 The Terrorist (1963 film), an Italian war drama film
 The Terrorists (film) or Ransom, a 1974 UK film starring Sean Connery
 The Terrorist (1994 film), an Egyptian film
 The Terrorist (1995 film), a South Korean film
 The Terrorist (1997 film), an Indian film
 Terrorists: The Kids They Sentenced, a 2003 Swedish documentary film
 The Terrorist (2010 film) or Five Minarets in New York, a Turkish film

Literature 
 Terrorist (novel), a 2006 novel by John Updike
 The Terrorist (novel), a 1997 young-adult novel by Caroline B. Cooney
 The Terrorists, a 1975 novel by Sjöwall and Wahlöö

Other uses 
 Terrorist (album), a 2005 album by Nattefrost, or the title song
 Terrorist (video game), a 1980 strategy game for the Apple II
 Jack Victory, American professional wrestler who also used the ring name The Terrorist
 "The Terrorist", a 1967 episode of The High Chaparral

See also 
 The Terrorizers, a Matt Helm novel
 The Terrorizers (film), a 1986 Taiwanese film
 Terror (disambiguation)